Scooby-Doo and Guess Who? is an American animated television series produced by Warner Bros. Animation and the thirteenth television series in the Scooby-Doo franchise. The series is produced by Chris Bailey.

The show first premiered on Boomerang's SVOD service on June 27, 2019, before making its linear debut on Cartoon Network on July 8, 2019, and on the Boomerang channel on October 1, 2020. The series moved to HBO Max and the remaining second-season episodes were released on October 1, 2021.

Premise
Following a similar premise to The New Scooby-Doo Movies, the series focuses on the Mystery Inc. gang as they solve mysteries while encountering and being assisted by various celebrities and fictional characters, including crossovers with DC Comics and Hanna-Barbera characters, and even the Scooby gang's very own voice actors.

Voice cast

Mystery, Inc.

 Frank Welker as Scooby-Doo, Fred Jones, Dynomutt, and Magilla Gorilla
 Matthew Lillard as Shaggy Rogers
 Grey Griffin as Daphne Blake
 Kate Micucci as Velma Dinkley

Guest stars

 Laila Ali
 Sean Astin
 Jessica Biel
 Terry Bradshaw
 Kimberly Brooks
 Alton Brown
 Carol Burnett
 Steve Buscemi
 Cher
 Joey Chestnut
 Kevin Conroy
 Ian James Corlett
 Sandy Duncan
 Jeff Dunham
 Darci Lynne Farmer
 Jeff Foxworthy
 Morgan Freeman
 Jim Gaffigan
 Ricky Gervais
 Johnny Gilbert
 Whoopi Goldberg
 Tim Gunn
 Gigi Hadid
 Jennifer Hale
 Halsey
 Mark Hamill
 David Kaye
 Chloe Kim
 Rachel Kimsey
 Liza Koshy
 Tara Lipinski
 Lucy Liu
 Macklemore
 Malcolm McDowell
 Kacey Musgraves
 Bill Nye
 Chris Paul
 Penn & Teller
 Axl Rose
 Kristen Schaal
 Charlie Schlatter
 Sia
 Joseph Simmons
 Christian Slater
 Jason Sudeikis
 Wanda Sykes
 George Takei
 Kenan Thompson
 Alex Trebek
 Neil deGrasse Tyson
 Steven Weber
 Jaleel White
 Jane Wiedlin
 Billy Dee Williams
 "Weird Al" Yankovic
 Maddie Ziegler

Fictional guest characters include The Hex Girls, Steve Urkel, Wonder Woman, Sherlock Holmes, Batman, Alfred Pennyworth, Joker, Flash, Trickster, Magilla Gorilla, the Ghost of Abraham Lincoln, Blue Falcon and Dynomutt and the characters from The Funky Phantom.

Episodes

Season 1 (2019–20)

Season 2 (2020–21)

Home media
The first season was released on DVD on January 19, 2021, by Warner Bros. Home Entertainment. The second season was released on DVD on June 28, 2022.

Notes

References

External links
  (Accessible in the United States only)
 

2010s American animated television series
2010s American mystery television series
2020s American animated television series
2020s American mystery television series
2019 American television series debuts
2021 American television series endings
American children's animated adventure television series
American children's animated comedy television series
American children's animated fantasy television series
American children's animated horror television series
American children's animated mystery television series
Animated television series about dogs
Animated television series reboots
Boomerang (TV network) original programming
Crossover animated television series
English-language television shows
HBO Max original programming
Scooby-Doo television series
Television series by Warner Bros. Animation